The butterfly effect is a metaphor for sensitive dependence on initial conditions in chaos theory.

Butterfly effect may also refer to:

Books
Butterfly Effect, a collection of poetry by Harry Humes
Murder in Maine: The Butterfly Effect, a novel by Mildred B. Davis and Katherine Roome
A Sound of Thunder, 1952 short story by Ray Bradbury

Film and television
El efecto mariposa, a 1995 Spanish film whose title translates to "The Butterfly Effect"
The Butterfly Effect, a 2004 film, followed by two sequels
"The Butterfly Effect" (Heroes), an episode of Heroes
Two episodes of Ugly Betty:
"The Butterfly Effect Part 1"
"The Butterfly Effect Part 2 (Ugly Betty)"
"Butterfly Effect" (Unforgettable), an episode of Unforgettable

Music
The Butterfly Effect (band), an Australian hard rock band
The Butterfly Effect (EP), a 2001 EP by the band
Butterfly Effect (Ashley Roberts album), 2014
Butterfly Effect, a 2020 album by Koven
The Butterfly Effect (Moonspell album), 1999
The Butterfly Effect, a 2009 album by Diana Yukawa
"Butterfly Effect" (Shiritsu Ebisu Chugaku song), 2014
"Butterfly Effect" (Travis Scott song), 2017
 "Butterfly Effect", a song by Exo on the album Obsession
"Butterfly Effect", a song by VIXX on the album Hades

Also see 

 Butterfly effect in popular culture